McKibbon may refer to:

People with the surname
Al McKibbon (1919-2005), American jazz player
Ox McKibbon, American college football player

Places
McKibbon House, historic house in Montevallo, Alabama, U.S.